Puerto Real Club de Fútbol is a football team based in Puerto Real, Province of Cádiz. Founded in 1948, the team plays in Primera Andaluza. 

The club's home ground is Ciudad Deportiva Bahía de Cádiz.

Season to season

35 seasons in Tercera División

Notable former players
 Francisco Luna

References

External links
Unofficial website 
 
lapreferente.com profile 

Football clubs in Andalusia
Association football clubs established in 1948
Divisiones Regionales de Fútbol clubs
1948 establishments in Spain